Vicente Valdés is a completely underground transfer station between the Line 4 and Line 5 of the Santiago Metro. The Line 4 station was opened on 30 November 2005 as the northern terminus of the inaugural section of the line between Vicente Valdés and Plaza de Puente Alto. The line 5 station was opened at the same day as a one station extension from Bellavista de La Florida. On 2 March 2006, Line 4 was extended north to Grecia.

References

Santiago Metro stations
Railway stations opened in 2005
2005 establishments in Chile
Santiago Metro Line 4
Santiago Metro Line 5